Sidhant Mohapatra, born 4 May 1966, popularly known as Munna Bhai, is an Indian film, television personality and politician who works predominantly in Odia,Also apeared Telugu,Tamil,Kannada,Malaylam,Bhojpuri,Marathi and Bengali Films.He is Regarded as the Megastar of ollywood. He has been featured in Forbes India's Celebrity 100 list based on his income. Siddhanta has acted in more than 200 movies with most of them (180) being lead roles. He Won National Award Two times For Kotiye Re Gotiye (2000) as producer and as Best actor in Negative  Swayamsiddha (2010). He has won numerous awards, including seven Odisha State Film Awards back-to-back, during 2000–2006, and a Filmfare Awards East award. He has produced and distributed 120 movies under his venture Omm Divya Vision Home Motion Picture, which was founded in 1992 with actress Divya Bharti.

Early and Personal Life
Sidhant was born as Gyana Ranjan Mohapatra in Brahmapur, Odisha to Dr. Kanak and Dr. Manmohan Mohapatra. He completed his early education from St. Vincent's Convent School, Brahmapur and did his higher secondary and graduation in commerce from Dharanidhar Autonomous College, Keonjhar. He completed his Post Graduate Diploma in Marketing from Institute of Marketing and Management, New Delhi in 1989. While starting his career in movies he changed his name to Sidhant legally.

Career

Acting
His debut film, Shradhanjali, starred Lekha Nanda as the female lead came in 1992. He has acted more than 200 Odia films and other language films.

Politics
He joined Biju Janata Dal in 2009 and contested as MP from Berhampur constituency in the 2009 "15th Lok Sabha" election, which he won. He won reelection in the 2014 general election by a margin of nearly 100,000 votes. However, he did not contest in his third bid.

Filmography

Awards

References 
11.^ "https://odishabytes.com/big-goof-up-on-odisha-actor-siddhant-mahapatras-wikipedia-page/amp/"

External links

orissacinema.com
www.welcomeorissa.com profile
Siddhanta Mohapatra Biography In Odia

1966 births
Living people
Lok Sabha members from Odisha
India MPs 2009–2014
Male actors in Odia cinema
India MPs 2014–2019
People from Brahmapur
Biju Janata Dal politicians
Indian actor-politicians
20th-century Indian male actors